Regina is  a Late Latin feminine name meaning "queen" from the Latin, Italian and Romanian word meaning the same. Regina was the name of an early Christian saint.

Variant forms include:
 Raina, Rayna, Raya (Bulgarian)
 Régine (French)
 Ρεγγίνα (Regina) (Greek)
 Regine (German/Norwegian)
 Ríona, Ríonach (Irish)
 Reina (Spanish)

See also

 Reginald
 Regina (disambiguation)

References

External links
 Regina - Baby Girl Name Meaning and Origin at Oh Baby! Names

Feminine given names
Given names